Siedlce Governorate was an administrative unit (governorate) of Congress Poland.

History
It was created in 1867 from the division of the Lublin Governorate. It was in fact a recreation of the older Podlasie Governorate, but now renamed to Siedlce Governorate. Siedlce Governorate was abolished in 1912 and its territory was divided between Lublin Governorate, Łomża Governorate and the newly created Kholm Governorate.

Language
By the Imperial census of 1897. In bold are languages spoken by more people than the state language.

References and notes

See also

 Geographical Dictionary of the Kingdom of Poland

 
Governorates of Congress Poland
States and territories established in 1867
States and territories disestablished in 1912
History of Lesser Poland
History of Lublin Voivodeship
History of Masovian Voivodeship